Harmeet Singh Sandhu is an Indian politician. He belongs to the Shiromani Akali Dal party. He is a former member of the Punjab Legislative Assembly and represented Tarn Taran from 2002 to 2017.

Political career
Sandhu was elected to the Punjab Legislative Assembly from Tarn Taran in 2002 as an independent candidate. In 2007, he successfully contested as Akali Dal candidate from Tarn Taran. In June 2011, he was appointed the Chief Parliamentary Secretary. He was re-elected to the Punjab Assembly in 2012.

References

External links
http://eciresults.nic.in/ConstituencywiseS1921.htm?ac=21

Living people
Shiromani Akali Dal politicians
Indian Sikhs
Punjab, India MLAs 2007–2012
Punjab, India MLAs 2012–2017
Year of birth missing (living people)
Place of birth missing (living people)
People from Tarn Taran district
Punjab, India MLAs 2002–2007